Jos Lambrechts (27 February 1936 – 22 February 2015) was a Belgian sprinter. He competed in the men's 4 × 400 metres relay at the 1960 Summer Olympics.

References

1936 births
2015 deaths
Athletes (track and field) at the 1960 Summer Olympics
Athletes (track and field) at the 1964 Summer Olympics
Belgian male sprinters
Belgian male middle-distance runners
Olympic athletes of Belgium
Place of birth missing